Saharun is an off-road race and adventure organised by the Budapest-based Coimbra Ltd. Participants can enter in two categories: Race and Adventure. The event is open for 4WD and 2WD cars, trucks, motorcycles and quads.

The SAHARUN also features a charity project, with the objective to help the countries it visits. The charity partner of the race is the African-Hungarian Union. Aids are gathered by the AHU, the organisers and also by the participating teams.

History 

The start of the first edition of the SAHARUN was scheduled for 16 March 2011. The destination was Tunisia. Just days before the start a revolution took part in the North-African country, forcing the organisers to postpone the start.

After closely watching the events in Tunisia, and seeing a normalised situatiuation, a new start date was made public: 8 March 2012.

In 2013 the SAHARUN will return in Tunisia. The route was published at the beginning of April. (see below)

SAHARUN 2012 - route, teams and results 

Budapest - Maranello - Civitavecchia - Tunis - Tozeur - Douz - Ksar Ghilane - El Borma - Tataouine - Monastir

 Vitéz Kürtős Team received the special award being the most charitable team.

SAHARUN 2013 - The Route 

Budapest - Maranello - Civitavecchia - Tunis - Gafsa - Douz - Tembaine - Dakhanis - Ksar Ghilane - Sfax - Monastir

References

External links 
SAHARUN official website

Off-road racing